Holy Trinity Church or the Most Holy Trinity is a Roman Catholic church in Powai, a suburb of Mumbai.It was built during the Portuguese era by the Jesuits in 1557. The church belongs to the Archdiocese of Bombay.

Gallery

References

Roman Catholic churches in Mumbai
Churches completed in 1557
1557 in India
Rebuilt churches in India
16th-century Roman Catholic church buildings in India